Nathalie Da Conceicao Carvalho (born 31 March 1966) is a French politician of the National Rally (RN). She was elected to the National Assembly representing Essonne's 2nd constituency in the 2022 election.

Biography
Da Conceicao Carvalho is of Portuguese descent, and was born in Blois, Loir-et-Cher to a supporter of the National Front (later National Rally). As of June 2022, she has four children and four grandchildren.

For the 2022 legislative election, Da Conceicao Carvalho was chosen as the RN candidate in Essonne's 2nd constituency, a more rural and right-leaning constituency than the rest of the department in the outskirts of Île-de-France. She came second to La France Insoumise (LFI) candidate Mathieu Hillaire in the first round but defeated him with 53.3% of the vote in the run-off to become Essonne's first RN deputy.

References

1966 births
Living people
People from Blois
National Rally (France) politicians
Deputies of the 16th National Assembly of the French Fifth Republic
French people of Portuguese descent
Women members of the National Assembly (France)
21st-century French politicians
21st-century French women politicians
Members of Parliament for Essonne